Vernon "Catfish" Smith (January 14, 1908 – September 29, 1988) was an American football, basketball, and baseball player, coach, and military officer.  A three-sport athlete at the University of Georgia, Smith was named to the 1931 College Football All-America Team as an end.  After his playing days, he served as the co-head basketball coach at his alma mater during the 1937–38 season.  Smith was also the head baseball coach at Georgia from 1934 to 1937 and at the University of South Carolina from 1938 to 1939 and again from 1946 to 1947.  He was inducted into the College Football Hall of Fame as a player in 1979.

Early life and playing career
Smith was born Macon, Georgia.  His nickname of "Catfish" is attributed to a story in which he bit the head off of one as a 25-cent bet while a student at Lanier High School in Macon.  He and a friend were fishing in Walnut Creek.

Smith played football at the University of Georgia from 1929 to 1931 and was named an All-American in 1931. In 1929, he scored all 15 points for Georgia in an upset of Yale—scoring one touchdown by falling on a blocked punt in the end zone and another by receiving a pass, kicking an extra point and tackling a Yale player for a safety. The game was the first-ever played at Sanford Stadium. Smith wore number 9, and stood 6'2" and 190 pounds. He made an all-time Georgia Bulldogs football team picked in 1935. He was nominated though not selected for an Associated Press All-Time Southeast 1920-1969 era team.  Smith was a member of the Sigma Chi fraternity.

Coaching and military career
After completing his Georgia career as a football player in 1931 (he graduated with a B.S. in 1933), Catfish Smith went into coaching from 1932 to 1941 and coached football at Georgia, the University of South Carolina and the University of Mississippi.  He was also the head baseball coach at the University of Georgia and the University of South Carolina.  He then joined the United States Army Air Forces, retiring in 1963 with the rank of colonel.

Honors
Smith's sports honors include induction into the Georgia Sports Hall of Fame in 1966 and in the College Football Hall of Fame in 1979.

His military honors included the Legion of Merit, Air Force Commendation Medal, World War II Victory Medal, National Defense Service Medal, Air Force Reserve Medal and Air Force Longevity Medal.

References

Sources
Charles E. Martin, I've Seen 'Em All: Half Century of Georgia Football, p. 57, The McGregor Company, Athens, Georgia, 1961.

External links
 

1908 births
1988 deaths
All-American college football players
All-Southern college football players
American football ends
American men's basketball players
United States Army Air Forces personnel of World War II
Basketball coaches from Georgia (U.S. state)
Basketball players from Georgia (U.S. state)
College Football Hall of Fame inductees
Georgia Bulldogs baseball coaches
Georgia Bulldogs baseball players
Georgia Bulldogs basketball coaches
Georgia Bulldogs basketball players
Georgia Bulldogs football players
Ole Miss Rebels football coaches
Players of American football from Georgia (U.S. state)
Recipients of the Legion of Merit
South Carolina Gamecocks baseball coaches
South Carolina Gamecocks football coaches
Sportspeople from Macon, Georgia
United States Army Air Forces officers
United States Air Force colonels